This is a round-up of the 1979 Sligo Senior Football Championship. The Championship had been reduced to eight teams for this year, following the introduction of the Intermediate grade. St. Mary's regained the title after a comfortable defeat of Tubbercurry in the final, and their dominance of Sligo club football was firmly set in motion.

Quarter finals

Semi-finals

Sligo Senior Football Championship Final

References

 Sligo Champion (August–September 1979)

Sligo Senior Football Championship
Sligo